The Group 1 racing class referred to FIA regulations for cars in touring car racing and rallying. Throughout its existence the group retained a definition of being standard, series production touring cars, and of having a character of being unmodified or not specifically prepared for racing. The class was introduced in the then new Appendix J of the International Sporting Code in 1954 and was replaced by Group N in 1982.

History
From its inception in 1954 until 1965, Group 1, officially documented at first as the first group, was included in Category I (or A), Touring Cars, with a production requirement of between 600 and 1000 cars in a 12 month period. The two categories had up to six groups in this time era, but not consistently or retaining the same definitions.

In 1966 the FIA categories were restructured and Group 1 were placed in Category A, Production Cars, with Category B and C used for Sports and Racing cars respectively. Group 1 essentially remained the same in character but with a heightened production requirement of 5000 cars. In 1982 the numbered groups were replaced by Groups N, A, B, C, D and E.

Groups 1-9

References

Rally groups
Rally racing
Fédération Internationale de l'Automobile
Touring car racing